Shane Herbert (born December 29, 1988) is a professional Canadian football defensive back who is currently a free agent. He was signed by the Toronto Argonauts in June 2011 after going undrafted in the 2011 CFL Draft. He returned to the Wilfrid Laurier Golden Hawks in 2011 to complete his fifth year of play. He re-joined the Argonauts and made his CFL debut on June 28, 2013 against the Hamilton Tiger-Cats, but sustained a season-ending injury in the game. He returned to play in the 2014 and 2015 seasons, playing in a total of 24 games with the Argonauts. He was part of Toronto's final cuts of 2016 training camp and was promptly signed by the Roughriders on June 19, 2016.

References

External links 
 Saskatchewan Roughriders bio 

1988 births
Living people
Canadian football defensive backs
People from Ajax, Ontario
Players of Canadian football from Ontario
Saskatchewan Roughriders players
Wilfrid Laurier Golden Hawks football players
Toronto Argonauts players